The American College of Veterinary Anesthesia and Analgesia (ACVAA) is one of 22 veterinary specialist organizations recognized by the American Veterinary Medical Association.

History 
The American Society of Veterinary Anesthesiology (ASVA) was founded in 1970 during an AVMA conference in Las Vegas, Nevada. The founding officers were Drs. Charles E. Short, William V. Lumb,  Donald C. Sawyer,  Lawrence R. Soma, and Daniel Roberts, with Dr. Short serving as the first president. The society received approval from the AVMA the following year.

In 1971, the ASVA appointed a committee headed by Dr. John Thurman to establish anesthesiology as a formally recognized AVMA specialty. A proposal was prepared and submitted to the AVMA Council on Education in 1973; however, it was initially rejected, with the COE advising that anesthesiologists be incorporated into the existing internal medicine or surgery specialty colleges. However, two years later, the proposal was granted preliminary recognition, and the ASVA became the American College of Veterinary Anesthesia (ACVA). The first qualifying exam was held in 1976, and full AVMA accreditation was awarded in 1980.

In 2012, recognizing the pivotal role of the specialty in treating pain in animals, the ACVA added "analgesia" to the name of the college, becoming the American College of Veterinary Anesthesia and Analgesia (ACVAA).

Membership 
Members of the ACVAA are board-certified specialists in veterinary anesthesia and analgesia and may refer to themselves as Diplomates of the American College of Veterinary Anesthesia and Analgesia (DACVAA). In order to become a diplomate, veterinarians must have earned a Doctor of Veterinary Medicine (DVM) degree or equivalent, completed a 12 month postgraduate internship, completed training in an approved residency program (3 years minimum), and passed the ACVAA certifying exam. The certifying exam consists of separate multiple choice, essay, and clinical competency exams over a period of 2-3 days. Publication of original research is required for candidates to sit for the exam.

, the AVMA reported 291 active ACVAA diplomates.

Function 
The ACVAA serves as the only recognized organization in North America granting board certification in veterinary anesthesia and analgesia. Members of the ACVAA are sought for their expert opinion on matters related to veterinary anesthesia and analgesia. They may be employed in private or academic veterinary hospitals, research institutions, or in health-related industries. Veterinary anesthesiologists fill a wide variety of roles, from clinical practice to research and education in the field of veterinary anesthesia and pain management. The ACVAA occasionally publishes guidelines and position statements to promote best practices in veterinary anesthesia.

Veterinary Anaesthesia and Analgesia is the official scientific publication of the ACVAA, ECVAA, and the Association of Veterinary Anaesthetists.

Executive officers

Residency programs 
Most veterinary anesthesia residency programs are filled through the Veterinary Internship and Residency Matching Program. ACVAA-approved residency programs are registered at the following institutions:
 Auburn University
 Colorado State University
 Cornell University College of Veterinary Medicine
 Hebrew University of Jerusalem
 Iowa State University College of Veterinary Medicine
 Kansas State University College of Veterinary Medicine
 Louisiana State University
 Michigan State University College of Veterinary Medicine
 Mississippi State University
 Murdoch University
 North Carolina State University College of Veterinary Medicine
 Ohio State University
 Oregon State University
 Purdue University
 Royal Veterinary College
 Texas A&M College of Veterinary Medicine
 The University of Queensland
 Tufts University
 University of California, Davis
 University of Florida College of Veterinary Medicine
 University of Georgia College of Veterinary Medicine
 University of Guelph
 University of Illinois College of Veterinary Medicine
 The University of Melbourne
 University of Minnesota
 Université de Montréal Faculty of Veterinary Medicine
 University of Pennsylvania School of Veterinary Medicine
 University of Prince Edward Island
 University of Tennessee
 University of Wisconsin-Madison
 Virginia-Maryland College of Veterinary Medicine
 Washington State University College of Veterinary Medicine
 Western College of Veterinary Medicine

See also 
 European College of Veterinary Anaesthesia and Analgesia
 Association of Veterinary Anaesthetists

References

External links 
 
 Veterinary Anaesthesia and Analgesia (journal)
 American Board of Veterinary Specialties

Veterinary organizations